Sandra Herbert née Swanson (born April 10, 1942 in Chicago) is an American historian of science with an international reputation as an expert on Charles Darwin. The Geological Society of London awarded her the 2020 Sue Tyler Friedman Medal.

Biography
Sandra Lynn Swanson's father was an accountant and both her grandfathers worked at Chicago steel mills. She graduated in 1963 with a B.A. in Interdisciplinary Studied from Wittenberg University. At Brandeis University, she graduated in the History of Ideas with an M.A. in 1965 and a Ph.D. in 1968. Her Ph.D. thesis is entitled The Logic of Darwin's Discovery. In 1966 she married James Charles Herbert (born 1941), who received his Ph.D. in 1970 from Brandeis University and became an education executive. Sandra and James Herbert have two daughters. She became a professor of history at the University of Maryland, Baltimore County and retired in 2009 as professor emerita.

Sandra Herbert was from 2007 to 2008 a Distinguished Visiting Scholar at Christ's College, Cambridge.
From February 2012 to February 2013 she was a visiting scholar at the University of California, Berkeley.

Her 2005 book Charles Darwin, Geologist has become the basic reference for Darwin's research on geology. In 2006 the book won the Geological Society of America's Mary C. Rabbitt History of Geology Award, the History of Science Society's Suzanne J. Levinson Prize, the American Historical Association's George L. Mosse Prize, and the Albion Book Prize from the North American Conference on British Studies.

In 2007 Sandra Herbert organized and led an expedition to the Galápagos Islands. There she and her colleagues in July 2007 on Isla Santiago located igneous rocks similar to the samples collected by Darwin. Thereby they gained a better understanding of how Darwin's field observations in geology are related to his research published in Geological Observations on the Volcanic Islands (1844).

She was a Guggenheim Fellow for the academic year 1982–1983. In 2006 she was elected a Fellow of the American Association for the Advancement of Science. She is also a Fellow of the Geological Society of America.

Selected publications

Articles

Books
  (published in the U.S.A. by Cornell University Press; online text from darwin-online.org)
  (1st edition 1987, published in London by British Museum (Natural History) and in Ithaca, N.Y. by Cornell University Press)

References

External links

 

1942 births
Living people
American historians of science
Wittenberg University alumni
Brandeis University alumni
University of Maryland, Baltimore County faculty
Fellows of the American Association for the Advancement of Science
Fellows of the Geological Society of America